Baru is a town under the administration of Xichang, Sichuan, China. , it administers the following six villages:
Jiawu Village
Hebian Village
Baima Village
Malu Village
Bazhe Village
Makuang Village

Baru was formed in December 2019 by merging the former Baru Township, Yinchang Township, and Baima Township.

See also 
 List of township-level divisions of Sichuan

References 

Towns in Sichuan
Xichang